Iandumoema is a genus of harvestmen, with three species:
Iandumoema uai, I. setimapocu, and I. smeagol, each known only from caves in the state of Minas Gerais, Southeastern Brazil. The genus name derives from the  Tupi language words iandu ("spider") and moema ("false"), in reference to the popular misconception that harvestmen are spiders. The species Iandumoema smeagol lacks eyes.

References

Harvestman genera
Cave arachnids
Invertebrates of Brazil